William Ernest may refer to:
 William Ernest, Grand Duke of Saxe-Weimar-Eisenach, last Grand Duke of Saxe-Weimar-Eisenach
 William Ernest, Duke of Saxe-Weimar
 Bill Ernest, Disney executive

See also
 Wilhelm Ernst, German chess master